The American Samoan Legislature or Fono has two chambers, the House of Representatives and the Senate, which has a directly elected head of government, the Governor of American Samoa.

The House of Representatives has 21 members, all elected for a two-year term. Fourteen of them are from single-seat districts, six are from dual-seat districts, and one is elected by a public meeting on Swain Island. The Senate has 18 members, elected for a four-year term by and from the chiefs of the islands. The Governor and their deputy, the Lieutenant Governor, are elected to a four-year term with a limit of two terms as governor.

Although individuals can and do affiliate with political parties, elections are held on a non-partisan basis, and candidates run without party labels. The governor and lieutenant governor are elected on a shared ticket.

As a U.S. territory, American Samoa also votes to send a non-voting delegate to the US House of Representatives, from American Samoa's at-large congressional district. The official head of state is the President of the United States. While American Samoans can vote in party primaries, they cannot vote in the general presidential election.

Latest elections

In 2020, incumbent delegate to the U.S. House of Representatives Amata Coleman Radewagen won re-election to a fourth term with 83.3 percent of the votes.

Also in 2020, Lieutenant Governor Lemanu Peleti Mauga was elected governor, replacing the term-limited Lolo Matalasi Moliga.

In 2018, a referendum seeking to amend the local constitution, and give the legislature the authority to override the governor's veto instead of the U.S. Secretary of Interior as happens now, was defeated.

See also
Electoral calendar
Electoral system
Political party strength in American Samoa

References

External links
 Adam Carr's Election Archives
 Report on Radio New Zealand about the 2006 General Election